Yang Sun may refer to:

Sun Yang (sportsperson) (born 1991), a Chinese swimmer
Bole (mythology), Chinese 6th century BCE horse-tamer and equine physiognomist, real name Yang Sun